Bomb: A Love Story is a 2018 Iranian war drama film by the Iranian director Peyman Moadi. Moadi also scripted the film, which was lensed by Mahmoud Kalari. Leila Hatami, Peyman Moadi, Siamak Ansari, Habib Rezaei and Mahmoud Kalari starred. The film premiered at the 2018 Fajr International Film Festival.

Plot 
In the middle of the war years and at the height of the bombing of Tehran, days pass with fear and dread. But love and affection and life and hope forget the tangible fear of death; The dead are repeated in the words of the living. Death is an absolute question and love is a recurring ambiguity. «Bomb; A "Love story" deals with the hopeful course of life, not the absolute blackness of death.

Cast 
 Peyman Moadi
 Leila Hatami
 Siamak Ansari
 Habib Rezaei
 Hojjat Hassanpour Sargaroui 
 Mahmoud Kalari

References

External links
 

Iran–Iraq War films
2010s Persian-language films
Iranian war drama films
2018 war drama films
Films set in schools
2018 films